Here is a live album by vibraphonist Cal Tjader which was recorded in 1977 and released on the Galaxy label in 1979.

Track listing
 "Tu Crees Que?" (Mongo Santamaria) – 6:00
 "Liz Anne" (Cal Tjader) – 6:41
 "Morning" (Clare Fischer) – 7:41	
 "Here" (David Mckay) – 8:14
 "If" (David Gates) – 4:45
"Gary's Theme" (Gary McFarland) - 7.20

Personnel
Cal Tjader – vibraphone, timbales
Clare Fischer – electric piano
Bob Redfield – electric guitar
Rob Fisher  – bass, electric bass
Pete Riso – drums
Poncho Sanchez – congas, bongos

References

Galaxy Records live albums
Cal Tjader albums
1979 live albums
Albums recorded at the Great American Music Hall